Oscar Padula Castro Rodríguez (born 28 November 1993) is a Uruguayan professional footballer who plays as a defender for Rampla Juniors.

Early life and career
Padula Castro was born on November 28, 1993 in Tacuarembó, Uruguay.

Padula Castro's career began in his hometown with the local football club Tacuarembó. His professional debut came on 13 October 2013 during a Segunda División defeat to Rocha, as he went on to make eleven more appearances in 2013–14 as they won the title to gain promotion to the Primera División. In October 2013 he suffered a nasal bridge fissure and was not in a game with Tacuarembo. He scored his first senior goal in a draw with Rampla Juniors on 23 November 2014. They were relegated back down to tier two in 2014–15, with Padula Castro eventually leaving midway through 2015–16 to join Bolívar in January 2016. 

In January 2016, he arrived in La Paz to play the Copa Libertadores de América, meaning Bolivar's team had eight foreign players including him. The hiring was seen as a surprise, with Oscar Padula as the last reinforcement hired by the team for the game. e remained for twelve months but didn't feature in league football, though did appear in the Copa Libertadores versus Racing Club.

In February 2017, Padula Castro completed a move back to Uruguay after agreeing a deal with Cerro Largo; having terminated his Bolívar contract. Two goals, versus Oriental and Rentistas, in thirty-two appearances followed across two seasons in the Segunda División. He was playing with Cerro Largo Fútbol Club in late 2017. On 22 July 2018, Padula Castro joined Acassuso of Argentina's Primera B Metropolitana. His first appearance came in a victory over Colegiales on 21 August. In 2020, he continued to be active with the team, said El Pais.

Career statistics
.

Honours
Tacuarembó
 Segunda División: 2013–14

References

External links

1993 births
Living people
People from Tacuarembó
Uruguayan footballers
Uruguayan expatriate footballers
Association football defenders
Uruguayan Segunda División players
Uruguayan Primera División players
Bolivian Primera División players
Primera B Metropolitana players
Tacuarembó F.C. players
Club Bolívar players
Cerro Largo F.C. players
Club Atlético Acassuso footballers
Rampla Juniors players
Expatriate footballers in Bolivia
Expatriate footballers in Argentina
Uruguayan expatriate sportspeople in Bolivia
Uruguayan expatriate sportspeople in Argentina